Skorodum is a rural locality (a village) in Tregubovskoye Rural Settlement, Velikoustyugsky District, Vologda Oblast, Russia. The population was 16 as of 2002.

Geography 
Skorodum is located 22 km southwest of Veliky Ustyug (the district's administrative centre) by road. Ustye-Povalikhino is the nearest rural locality.

References 

Rural localities in Velikoustyugsky District